Andrzej Jan Szejna (born 28 April 1973, in Końskie) is a Polish politician and Member of the European Parliament (MEP) for the Lesser Poland Voivodeship & Świętokrzyskie Voivodeship with the Democratic Left Alliance-Labor Union, part of the Socialist Group and is vice-chair of the European Parliament's Committee on Legal Affairs.

Szejna is a substitute for the Committee on Budgets, a member of the Delegation for relations with Belarus and a substitute for the Delegation for relations with the Korean Peninsula, Taiwan and the Philippines.

Education
 1999: Master of Economics at the Warsaw School of Economics (1998) and Masters of Law University of Warsaw

Career
 since 2001: Articled clerk at the Regional Chamber of Legal Counsellors in Warsaw
 since 2001: Lecturer (since 1999), Vice-Dean of the Department of International Relations at the University of Insurance and Banking (WSUiB)
since 2014: Teacher of law at the Academy of Finances and Business Vistula in Warsaw
 2001-2003: Advisor to the Secretary of State at the Ministry of Finance
 2003-2004: Under-secretary of State at the Ministries of Economy, and Labour and Social Policy, then Vice-Chairman of PAIiZ S.A.(Państwowa Agencja Informacji i Inwestycji Zagranicznych, Spółka Akcyjna), responsible for overseas investments and the promotion of exports, subsequently Deputy minister for European Affairs at the Office of the Committee on European Integration
 2002-2003: Secretary of the Team on European Integration of the National Council of the Democratic Left Alliance (SLD) (2000-2002), member of the National Executive Committee (SLD)
 since 2002: National plenipotentiary of the Coalition Election Committee of the SLD-UP
 Member of the National Council of the SLD (2003)
 1997-1999: President of the Students' Parliament of the Republic of Poland
 1997-1999: Officer of the Chief Council of Higher Education of the Republic of Poland

See also
2004 European Parliament election in Poland

External links
 
 

1973 births
Living people
Democratic Left Alliance politicians
Democratic Left Alliance MEPs
MEPs for Poland 2004–2009
Members of the Polish Sejm 2019–2023
University of Warsaw alumni
SGH Warsaw School of Economics alumni